Agriculture is an important part of the economy of Hawaii. Though Hawaii relies heavily on imports of food from mainland United States and other parts of the world, export of cash crop specific to the tropical growing environment of Hawaii has made agriculture one of the more important economic sectors. 

During the early part of control of Hawaii by the United States, early cash crops included pineapple and sugar, which were tightly controlled by a small network of businessmen "the Big Five", who monopolized control of the sugar industry's profits. The industry has since diversified in terms of ownership in exports.

According to the USDA in 2022, the state of Hawaii had over 7300 farm operations working on 1,100,000 acres. By weight, honey bees may be the state's most valuable export. According to the Hawaii Agricultural Statistics Service, agricultural sales were million from diversified agriculture, million from pineapple, and million from sugarcane. Hawaii's relatively consistent climate has attracted the seed industry, which is able to test three generations of crops per year on the islands, compared with one or two on the mainland. Seeds yielded  million in 2012, supporting 1,400 workers.

Historic practices

Aquaculture

Crops

Coffee

Macadamia nuts

Sugar

Wine

Issues

GMOs

References 

Agriculture in Hawaii
History of Hawaii